Săliștea de Sus is a town in Maramureș County, Maramureș, Romania. It was declared a town in 2004.

References

External links

  Official site

Populated places in Maramureș County
Localities in Romanian Maramureș
Towns in Romania